Émile Laurent Diokel Thiakane (born 17 November 1991) is a Senegalese professional footballer playing for Puszcza Niepołomice.

Career

In 2010, Thiakane signed for Polish lower league side Lider Włocławek after being spotted at a tournament in the country.

In 2013, he signed for Olympique Saint-Quentin in the French fifth division.

In 2014, he signed for Polish fourth division team Pogoń Mogilno.

In 2020, Thiakane signed for Korona Kielce in the Polish second division.

References

External links
 Emile Thiakane at 90minut

Senegalese footballers
Living people
Association football forwards
1991 births
People from Dakar Region
Zawisza Bydgoszcz players
Olympique Saint-Quentin players
GKS Bełchatów players
Korona Kielce players
Puszcza Niepołomice players
I liga players
II liga players
Expatriate footballers in Poland